Ali Çayır (born September 13, 1981) is a Turkish volleyball player. He is 197 cm. He plays for Jastrzębski Węgiel Team since 2009 season start and wear 8 number. He played 150 times for national team. He also played for SSK, Emlak Bank, Kollejliler, Tokat Plevne, Halkbank, İstanbul Büyükşehir Belediyesi and Galatasaray.

External links
Player profile at galatasaray.org
Player profile at bringitusa.com

1981 births
Living people
Sportspeople from Ankara
Turkish men's volleyball players
Halkbank volleyball players
Galatasaray S.K. (men's volleyball) players
Jastrzębski Węgiel players